The list of São Paulo State University people includes notable graduates, professors, and administrators affiliated with the São Paulo State University, located in São Paulo, Brazil with 23 campuses all throughout the state of São Paulo.

Alumni

Arts

Media

Music

Politics

Science

Sports

Other

Faculty 
Notable faculty members of UNESP include:

References 

São Paulo State University
São Paulo State University alumni
Academic staff of the São Paulo State University